Mária Mednyánszky (7 April 1901 Budapest – 22 December 1978 also Budapest) was a Hungarian international table tennis star.

Table tennis career
She became the first official women's world champion winning the women's singles event gold medal in the first edition of the World Table Tennis Championships, held in 1926 at London. She went on to win the title for five successive years and won a further 18 world titles. Only Angelica Rozeanu holds more women's singles titles than her.

She won seven doubles titles including six consecutive wins with Anna Sipos. She also won three English Open titles.

Awards
She was awarded the Golden Order of the Hungarian People's Republic in 1976, Hungary's highest sporting honour.

See also
 List of table tennis players
 List of World Table Tennis Championships medalists

References

 Maria Mednyanszky ITTF Hall of Fame. Accessed September 2007
 Maria Mednyanszky at  I GUINNESS DEL TENNISTAVOLO (Italian) Accessed Sept 2007

Hungarian female table tennis players
1901 births
1978 deaths
Table tennis players from Budapest